Francisco Manuel Rui-Gómez y Dañobeitia, 5th Marquess of San Isidro, OM (28 September 18045 August 1885) was a Spanish peer, army officer, politician and intellectual who fought for the Liberals in the Carlist Wars and later served as Senator for the Province of León as well as Senator for life in 1864.

Early life
Born Francisco Manuel María Wenceslao in A Coruña, into one of the most influential noble houses of León. His father, Francisco de Paula Rui-Gómez y de Prado, 4th Marquess of San Isidro, was posted there as field marshal of the Royal Spanish Armies at the time he was born. His ancestor, Pablo Rui-Gómez Lasso de la Vega y Balmaseda, had been granted the title of Marquess of San Isidro in 1730 by the king Philip V, in recognition to his patronage of the Basílica of San Isidoro in León.

Military career

Political career

Marriage and issue

Rui-Gómez married María del Carmen de Riobóo y Roldán, Countess of Taboada (d. 1839). They had one child:
Nicolás María Rui-Gómez y Riobóo (1830–1869), married to his first cousin, Francisca de Riobóo y Álvarez (1837–1918)

Heraldry

See also
Marquess of San Isidro
Carlist Wars

References

External links

Ancestors of Francisco Manuel Rui-Gómez, 5th Marquess of San Isidro

1804 births
1885 deaths
Conservative Party (Spain) politicians